The plain inezia or plain tyrannulet (Inezia inornata) is a species of passerine bird in the family Tyrannidae. It is found in Argentina, Bolivia, Brazil, Paraguay, and Peru. Its natural habitats are subtropical or tropical dry forests and subtropical or tropical moist lowland forests.

References

plain inezia
Birds of the Gran Chaco
Birds of the Pantanal
plain inezia
Taxonomy articles created by Polbot